The 2009 Pan American Race Walking Cup was held in San Salvador, El Salvador on 1–2 May.  The track of the Cup runs in the Boulevard del Hipódromo, Zona Rosa.

A detailed report was given by Javier Clavelo Robinson.
Complete results were published

Medallists

Results

Men's 20 km

Team

Men's 50 km

Team

Men's 10 km (Junior)

Team

Women's 20 km

Team

Women's 10 km (Junior)

Team

Participation
The participation of 120 athletes from 15 countries was announced to participate. However, because of visa problems, the majority (namely 11 out of 13) of the Ecuadorian athletes was not allowed to enter the country.  An unofficial count therefore only yields 108 participants.

 (14)
 (5)
 (1)
 (11)
 (7)
 (1)
 (2)
 (16)
 (14)
 México (18)
 (1)
 Panamá (3)
 Perú (1)
 (4)
 (10)

See also
 2009 Race Walking Year Ranking

References

External links
IAAF

Pan American Race Walking Cup
Pan American Race Walking Cup
Pan American Race Walking Cup
International athletics competitions hosted by El Salvador
21st century in San Salvador